Brown Gelly is a tor, hill and ridge near Dozmary Pool on Bodmin Moor near Liskeard in Cornwall, UK.

At its foot lies Browngelly Downs, and the area has preserved various remains of hut circles, barrows and cairns. Five cairns are located in a semi-circular arc along the ridge of Brown Gelly. They are prominent from a distance and Christopher Tilley suggests they were intended to be seen as a group from the west and the east in order to "analogically resemble or simulate tors". The tor is made of a granitic rock that has less autogenic alteration than other areas of Bodmin Moor due to some type of local anomaly. Archaeological aerial reconnaissance was carried out over the area in the 1980s which suggested the remains of a prehistoric settlement comprising several dispersed hut circles. These structures have also been called a "barrow group" by John Barnatt Evidence of flint production and tin streaming has also been found in the area that supports the suggestion of an ancient settlement.

References

External links

 The Modern Antiquarian Entry about Brown Gelly Cairns
 Geograph Map Reference for Brown Gelly, Browngelly Downs, Cairns and Hut Circles

Tourist attractions in Cornwall
Hills of Cornwall
Bodmin Moor
Ridges of England